Jack Storey (born 1 July 1929) was an Australian rules footballer who played with Footscray in the Victorian Football League (VFL). He also played for Port Melbourne and coached Sunshine in the Victorian Football Association (VFA).

Career

Footscray
Storey played originally in the Footscray District Football League, for West Footscray. He won the league's "C Grade" best and fairest award in 1947 and soon after represented a combined district team against Footscray and made enough of an impression to be recruited by the VFL club.

A centreman, Storey played five games for Footscray in the 1948 VFL season, with his debut coming against Hawthorn in round 14. He made a further six appearances in 1949, then joined Port Melbourne in the VFA the following year.

VFA
Storey won Port Melbourne's best and fairest in his first season, which ended in the disappointment of a grand final loss, to Oakleigh. Port Melbourne were runners up again in 1951 and 1952, before triumphing in 1953, when they defeated Yarraville by 60 points in the grand final, with Storey as centreman. He remained with the club until his appointment as captain-coach of Metropolitan League club Sunshine in 1956.

Sunshine were admitted into the VFA in 1959, under Ken Seymour, but Storey was non playing coach for the second half of the 1960 season, as well as the 1961 VFA season.

References

External links

1929 births
Living people
Australian rules footballers from Victoria (Australia)
Western Bulldogs players
Port Melbourne Football Club players
West Footscray Football Club players
Sunshine Football Club (VFA) coaches